Kızılhisar, is a village of Yenişehir district in Bursa, Turkey.

History 
The village was named after the color of the earth, and the ruined castle of the village. The village's history dates back to approximately 15th century.

Culture 
On religious or public holidays, young girls in the village gather around the old oak tree, whose age is estimated to be around 500, and celebrate by singing songs. Furthermore, every year on the first Sunday of June, a fair is being held. Tarhana, fried meat and popara can be considered as the noted foods of the village.

Geography 
The village is about 72 km away from Bursa city center, and 17 km away from Yenişehir city center. In the high hills of the village, a glimpse of Lake Iznik can be caught.

Climate 
The climate of the village can be defined as typical Mediterranean climate.

Economy 
The economy of the village depends greatly on agriculture. Mainly, onion, beans, tomato, pepper, wheat, barley, plum, peach, melon, watermelon and grapes are cultivated in the village.

Muhtars of the village 
The muhtars of the village are shown below.

References

Villages in Yenişehir District, Bursa